Martin Nodell (November 15, 1915 – December 9, 2006) was an American cartoonist and commercial artist, best known as the creator of the Golden Age superhero Green Lantern. Some of his work appeared under the pen name Mart Dellon.

Biography

Early life
Born in Philadelphia, Pennsylvania, Nodell was the son of Jewish immigrants. He attended the Art Institute of Chicago. When he was 18 years old he moved to New York City, where he attended Pratt Institute. He worked as an actor in both Chicago and New York, and began his drawing career by selling caricatures for theatrical publicity work before turning full time to comic book art.

National Comics Publications
Nodell began his illustrating career in 1938, working first as a freelancer. In 1940 he provided some work for Sheldon Mayer, an editor at All-American Publications, one of three companies that ultimately merged to form National Comics Publications (present-day DC Comics). Interested in gaining more steady employment, Nodell created designs for a new character that would become the Golden Age Green Lantern (Alan Scott). The inspiration came in January 1940 at the 34th Street subway station in Manhattan. Nodell noticed a trainman waving a lantern along the darkened tracks. He coupled the imagery with elements from Richard Wagner's operatic Ring cycle as well as Chinese folklore and Greek mythology to create the hero.

As Nodell himself described in 2000:

The first adventure, drawn by Nodell (as Mart Dellon) and written by Bill Finger, appeared in All-American Comics #16 (July 1940). Nodell continued to use the pseudonym through at least All Star Comics #2 (Fall 1940). He said in 2000 he had used the pen name since, "Comics were a forbidden literature, culturally unacceptable. It wasn't something you were proud of." Nodell penciled and virtually always self-inked Green Lantern stories in All-American and All Star until the character got his own title, the premiere issue cover-dated July 1941. He would continue with it through to #25 (May 1947), very rarely drawing the covers, before being succeeded by a variety of artists including Howard Purcell, Irwin Hasen, and Alex Toth.

Timely Comics

Nodell left All-American in 1947 and joined Timely Comics, the 1930s–40s forerunner of Marvel Comics, where he drew postwar stories of Captain America, the Human Torch and the Sub-Mariner. His work there was rarely signed, making idenfication difficult, though comics historians have confirmed that Nodell drew two well-known covers: The first issue of Marvel Tales, Timely's horror-comics revamp of the company's flagship series Marvel Mystery Comics; and the penultimate issue (#74) of Captain America's book, which for its last two issues became the horror-oriented Captain America's Weird Tales.

Post-1950s career
In 1950, Nodell left comics to work in advertising and later joined the Leo Burnett Agency in Chicago as an art director. In 1965, his design team there developed the long-running flour-company mascot the Pillsbury Doughboy.

His only known comics work in the interim are penciling the story "The Glistening Death" in the Avon Comics one-shot City of the Living Dead (1952), reprinted two decades later in the Skywald horror-comics magazine Psycho #1 (Jan. 1971); and "Master of the Dead" in Avon's Eerie (1951 series) #14, reprinted in Skywald's Nightmare #1 (Dec. 1970).

In the 1980s, Nodell submitted new work to DC, which led to his being rediscovered by comic fans. His first pieces included a 13-page puzzle-and-activity section in Super Friends Special #1 (1981), and drawing the Golden Age Harlequin in Who's Who: The Definitive Directory of the DC Universe #10 (Dec. 1985). His final two published pieces of Green Lantern art were a one-page illustration of Golden Age Alan Scott Green Lantern in the 50th-anniversary issue Green Lantern vol. 3, #19 (Dec. 1991) and a one-page illustration of the Alan Scott Green Lantern and Superman in the one-shot Superman: The Man of Steel Gallery #1 (Dec. 1995). At 80, Nodell penciled his final comic-book work, the whimsical, 10-page Harlan Ellison adaptation "Gnomebody", scripted by John Ostrander and Ellison and inked by Jed Hotchkiss, in Dark Horse Comics' Harlan Ellison's Dream Corridor Quarterly #1 (Aug. 1996).

Personal life
Nodell met his future wife, Carrie, at Coney Island in Brooklyn, New York, in September 1940. They were married December 1, 1941, and afterward moved to Huntington, Long Island, to move in with Nodell's brother Simon, an engineer at Republic Aviation. They lived there two years before moving back to Brooklyn, New York City. The couple was living in West Palm Beach, Florida, by 2000. Nodell died  December 9, 2006, in a nursing home in Muskego, Wisconsin, of natural causes, almost one month past his 91st birthday. They had two sons: Spencer, who lived in Waukesha, Wisconsin at the time of his father's death, and Mitchell.

Awards
Nodell received the Inkpot Award in 1986. In 2011, Nodell was nominated as a Judges' Choice for The Will Eisner Award Hall of Fame.

References

External links

1915 births
2006 deaths
American comics artists
Artists from Philadelphia
Pratt Institute alumni
School of the Art Institute of Chicago alumni
Will Eisner Award Hall of Fame inductees
Jewish American artists
Golden Age comics creators
Inkpot Award winners